Charles Morrison (1932–2005) was a British Conservative politician and MP for Devizes.

Charles Morrison may also refer to:
Sir Charles Morison (MP for Tavistock) (1549–1599), or Morrison, English politician in the reign of Queen Elizabeth I
Sir Charles Morrison, 1st Baronet (1587–1628), English politician in the reigns of King James VI & I and King Charles I
Charles Clayton Morrison (1874–1966), American Disciples of Christ minister and Christian socialist
Charles Morrison (cricketer) (1883–1948), West Indian cricketer
Chick Morrison (1878–1924), American silent film actor

See also
 Charles Morison (1861–1920), New Zealand barrister and politician
 Morrison (surname)